Water Bearer is the debut studio album by British singer-songwriter Sally Oldfield, released in 1978.

The song "Mirrors" was released as a single, and reached No. 19 in the UK charts.

Track listing
All songs written by Sally Oldfield. Quotations in "Songs of the Quendi" by J. R. R. Tolkien.

Side 1
 "Water Bearer" – 6:25
 "Songs of the Quendi" – 12:46
"Night Theme"
"Wampum Song"
"Nenya"
"Land of the Sun"
 "Mirrors" – 3:29 (This track, also released as a single, is missing from some versions)

Side 2
 "Weaver" – 3:38
 "Night of the Hunter's Moon" – 3:26
 "Child of Allah" – 3:19
 "Song of the Bow" – 3:37
 "Fire and Honey" – 2:30
 "Song of the Healer" – 3:19

Charts

Personnel
 Sally Oldfield – vocals, guitar, piano, synthesizer, Moog Taurus, harpsichord, Hammond organ, mandolin, marimba, glockenspiel, vibraphone, percussion
 Frank Ricotti – percussion, vibraphone, marimba
 Dave Lawson – synthesizer
 Trevor Spencer – synth drums
 Tim Wheater – cymbal
 Jean Price – harp
 Brian Burrows – vocals
Also:
 Art Direction – Martin Poole
 Engineer – Ashley Howe, Dave Grinstead, Mark Dearnley
 Mixed By – Ashley Howe, Sally Oldfield
 Mixed By (Assistant) – John Gallen, Julian Cooper
 Photography – Paul Wakefield
 Typography – Mike Pratley
 Writer, Arranger and Producer – Sally Oldfield

References

External links
 The Widening Eye review
 Ground and Sky review

1978 debut albums
Music based on Middle-earth
Bronze Records albums